Rodniki is a microdistrict in Kalininsky District of Novosibirsk, Russia. Population of over 65,000.

History
The first residential buildings of the microdistrict were built in the 1980s.

Education
8 kindergartens and 4 secondary schools (No. 203, No. 207, No. 211, No. 218) are located in the microdistrict.

Religion
 Saint Andrew the Apostle Church is an Orthodox church built in 2012–2017.

Economy

Retail
The microdistrict hosts shops of Lenta and Leroy Merlin.

Sports
 Sports complex with a fencing hall and a swimming pool.

Gallery

References

Kalininsky City District, Novosibirsk
Neighborhoods in Russia